Marilyn Mary Black (born 20 May 1944 in New South Wales, Australia) is a former Australian sprinter, who after her marriage became known as Marilyn Vassella. Black was educated at Fort Street High School in Sydney. She was a primary school teacher at Dulwich Hill primary school for two years in 1963/64.

Black first received attention at the age of seventeen, when she won the 100 yards race in the New South Wales championships. In 1963 she won the 4 x 100 yards event with the NSW relay team. At the 1964 Summer Olympics in Tokyo she won the bronze medal in the 200 metres event.

References

External links 

 Sports Reference

1944 births
Living people
Australian female sprinters
Athletes (track and field) at the 1964 Summer Olympics
Olympic athletes of Australia
People from New South Wales
Medalists at the 1964 Summer Olympics
Olympic bronze medalists for Australia
Olympic bronze medalists in athletics (track and field)
Olympic female sprinters